Master of Jurisprudence is sometimes used as an alternative name for both Master of Laws and Master of Juridical Science.

Offered within United States law schools, students of a Master of Jurisprudence (abbreviated as M.J. and/or M.Jur.), curriculum are often business professionals and/or Juris Doctor degree holders who wish to enhance their knowledge in a specialized field of law.  A Master of Jurisprudence is highly beneficial for those that need an in-depth understanding of the law within current executive level positions.

Master of Jurisprudence students are required to develop a comprehensive understanding of the operation of law as it applies to a specified area of law. Master of Jurisprudence program offerings may focus on Business and Corporate Governance Law, Immigration Law, Health Law, Administrative Law, Real Estate Law, and Risk Management. Some Master of Jurisprudence programs combine a combination of graduate level legal courses with MBA-style courses in concentrated areas of study.

The Master of Jurisprudence program typically ranges between 30 and 45 credit hours. Some students may be able to complete the program in as little as one year, depending on their academic status. Some universities are even offering Master of Jurisprudence programs online.

Master of Jurisprudence degrees are designed to provide a deeper understanding of the U.S. legal system to business professionals. While some classes may be shared with J.D. candidates, the Master of Jurisprudence does not prepare recipients to sit for the bar exam to practice law, but rather provides a better understanding of legal issues related to the recipient's chosen field. Generally, Master of Jurisprudence degrees are geared towards non-lawyer professionals.

References 

Master's degrees
Law degrees